Langensoultzbach is a commune in the Bas-Rhin department in Grand Est in north-eastern France.

The commune is part of the Palatinate Forest-North Vosges Biosphere Reserve.

Geography
The village is some twenty kilometres (twelve miles) to the south-west of Wissembourg and the closest crossings of the Franco-German frontier reachable on a classified road.  Slightly more direct and shorter routes to Germany may be available to hikers.

The village is a couple of kilometres from departmental road RD 27, which runs between the villages of Lembach and Wœrth, beyond which it continues to Haguenau.  The heart of the village is set in farmland, although most of the surrounding countryside is still made up of woodland.

See also
 Communes of the Bas-Rhin department

References

Communes of Bas-Rhin
Bas-Rhin communes articles needing translation from French Wikipedia